Miguel Edgardo Martínez Pineda (born 12 August 1965) is a Honduran politician. He currently serves as deputy of the National Congress of Honduras representing the National Party of Honduras for Comayagua.

References

1965 births
Living people
Deputies of the National Congress of Honduras
National Party of Honduras politicians
People from Comayagua Department
Place of birth missing (living people)